Peter Kiška (born 10 May 1981) is a Slovak footballer who plays as a midfielder for Kissos Kissonerga F.C. in Cypriot Fourth Division.

External links 
 

1981 births
Living people
Slovak footballers
Slovakia international footballers
Slovak expatriate footballers
FK Dubnica players
MŠK Žilina players
FC Sheriff Tiraspol players
Digenis Akritas Morphou FC players
Slovak Super Liga players
Moldovan Super Liga players
Cypriot Second Division players
Expatriate footballers in Moldova
Expatriate footballers in Cyprus

Association football midfielders